The 6th Aerobic Gymnastics European Championships was held in Liberec, Czech Republic in November 2009.

Results

Women's Individual

Men’s Individual

Mixed pair

Trio

Groups

Medal table

References

External links
European Union of Gymnastics Statistics: 6th European Championships 2009 - Liberec

Aerobic Gymnastics European Championships
2009 in gymnastics
International gymnastics competitions hosted by the Czech Republic 
2007 in Czech sport